Bermudo or Vermudo, from Latin Veremundus, is a given name of Germanic origin. It may refer to:
Veremund (fl. c. 500), Suevic king of Galicia
Bermudo I of Asturias (r. 788–91), king, called "the Deacon" (el Diácono)
Bermudo II of León (r. 984–99), king, called "the Gouty" (el Gotoso)
Bermudo III of León (r. 1029–37), king
Bermudo Núñez (d. c. 955), first count of Cea
Bermudo (bishop of Oviedo) (d. 992/3)
Bermudo Ovéquiz (fl. 1044–92), Asturian magnate
Bermudo Pérez de Traba (d. 1168), Galician magnate